Plectostoma laidlawi is a species of air-breathing land snail with an operculum, a terrestrial gastropod mollusk in the family Diplommatinidae.

Ecology 
Predators of Plectostoma laidlawi include larvae of Pteroptyx valida.

References

Diplommatinidae
Gastropods described in 1902